The Frankenlied (Song of Franconia), or Lied der Franken (The Franconians' song) is the unofficial anthem of the German region of Franconia, and one of the most popular German commercium songs. It is also sung at official occasions in the districts of Lower Franconia, Middle Franconia, and Upper Franconia. The text of the hymn was written by Joseph Victor von Scheffel in 1859, the melody was composed by Valentin Eduard Becker in 1861.

Origins 

Scheffel originally wrote the song as a hiking song in order to capture the wanderlust literarily in 1859. Back then, the writer, who was born in the Grand Duchy of Baden, spent a couple of weeks at the Franconian Banz Castle, located near the Staffelberg.

Various versions of the song exist on the internet and in songbooks. The lyrics themselves also contain inconsistencies in regard to content. The patron saint of the vintners is not actually Saint Kilian—the patron saint of Franconia—but Saint Urban of Langres. Apart from that, a Saint Veit of Staffelstein does not exist, but a Saint Veit of the Ansberg, whose chapel is located on the Ansberg hill near Dittersbrunn, a district of Ebensfeld, does. However, it could also be one of the Fourteen Holy Helpers who are venerated in the Basilica of the Fourteen Holy Helpers located near Bad Staffelstein. The best explanation for this discrepancy may be derived from the Staffelberg's history. From 1696 to 1929, religious hermits were living on the hill. Von Scheffel may thus have meant the hermit Ivo Hennemann who was living on the Staffelberg at the time. In the lyrics, von Scheffel describes how he ascends to "Veit" (see 4th stanza) and drinks his wine (see 6th stanza).

Sheet music 
 as audio example, created in Finale 2010

Lyrics

1 depending on the recorded text version, "allerschönsten" (most beautiful; most received version), "allersonn'gsten" (most sunny), or "allersonnigsten" (most sunny; cannot be sung as it has one syllable too much)

Franconian additions 

The additional stanzas seven, eight, and nine, which were written by Gerd Bachert, Hermann Wirth, and Karl Frisch, are not officially part of the Frankenlied. In them, the writers criticise the attempted annexation of Franconia by Bavaria caused by Napoleon.

External links

German anthems
Regional songs